Chatterbox ("Za zui zi", also known as An Innocent Babbler) is a 1993 Chinese comedy-drama film  written and directed by Liu Miaomiao.

The film was entered into the main competition at the 50th edition of the Venice Film Festival, in which it won the President of the Italian Senate's Gold Medal. It also won the Special Jury Prize at the first Beijing College Student Film Festival.

Plot

Cast 
  
  Cao Cuifen as Shu Ying
 Guo Shaoxiong as Wang Laoshi
Lei Li as Min Sheng
  Lu Xiaoyan  as Yan Wai
Yuan Jing  as Qun Sheng

References

External links

1993 comedy-drama films
1993 films
Films directed by Liu Miaomiao
Chinese comedy-drama films